The naked-nosed shrew tenrec (Microgale gymnorhyncha) is a species of mammal in the family Tenrecidae. It is endemic to Madagascar. Its natural habitats are subtropical and tropical moist lowland and monaten forests.

References

Afrosoricida
Mammals of Madagascar
Mammals described in 1996
Taxonomy articles created by Polbot